Five of Swords is a Minor Arcana tarot card.

Tarot cards are used throughout much of Europe to play tarot card games.

In English-speaking countries, where the games are largely unknown, Tarot cards came to be utilized primarily for divinatory purposes.

Divination usage

The figure in the foreground suggests victory, potency, and ample preparation or confidence. 
Also suggests unwilling or unnecessary contributions from losing parties.  This card also is the "defeat card" in the deck. The ragged-looking and "torn-asunder" sky implies a frayed, shabby, and jagged celestial plane. This card can represent dangerous overconfidence, and in its reversed form indicates a seeming-triumph which will be ultimately calamitous.

References

Suit of Swords